Neller is a surname. Notable people with the surname include:

Dane Neller (born 1956), American businessman and entrepreneur
Keith Neller (born 1960), Australian rugby league footballer 
Robert Neller (born 1953), United States Marine Corps four-star general

See also
Nellore